Nicholas Beggs (born 15 December 1961) is an English musician, noted for playing the bass guitar and the Chapman Stick; he is a member of the Mute Gods and Kajagoogoo, formerly also a part of Iona and Ellis, Beggs & Howard and plays in the band of Steven Wilson. He is known for modifying a Chapman Stick into a fully MIDI-capable instrument triggering MIDI from both bass and melody strings; he calls it the Virtual Stick.

Early life
Beggs was born on 15 December 1961 in Winslow, Buckinghamshire. His parents were Herby and Joan Beggs, and he has a younger sister, Jacqueline. His father left when he was young but came back into his life at a later age. In November 1979, Beggs' mother died of cancer, leaving him to care for his sister, who was then 15. He took a job as a dustman upon leaving school.

Career
Beggs' first band Johnny and the Martians (formed when he was 10) consisted of two friends on trumpet and acoustic guitar and Beggs on drums. He went to Linslade Secondary School. 
After attending art school, in 1978 Beggs formed the band Art Nouveau with Steve Askew, Stuart Croxford Neale and Jez Strode.  Chris Hamill (Limahl) joined the band in 1981 and at Beggs' suggestion it was renamed Kajagoogoo. The release of the first single "Too Shy" in January 1983 saw the band on a promotional tour as the record reached number 1 in the UK Singles Chart. The band went on to have four more UK top 40 hits throughout 1983 and 1984.

After firing lead singer Limahl in 1983 and, following a split with Strode in 1985, the three remaining band members reformed as Kaja, releasing the album Crazy Peoples Right to Speak and the single "Shouldn't Do That".

Between 1985 and 1987, Beggs concentrated on writing with various other songwriters and formed Ellis, Beggs & Howard in March 1987. Ellis, Beggs and Howard split in 1989, and in 1990 Beggs joined the progressive folk band Iona. He recorded two albums with them: The Book of Kells and Beyond These Shores.

He continued working with various artists and bands, including Gary Numan, Alphaville, Belinda Carlisle, Emma Bunton (on her album Life in Mono) and Led Zeppelin's former bass player, John Paul Jones. In 1996, Beggs met Howard Jones on a flight from the United States, and Jones invited Beggs to tour as part of his band.

Beggs worked as a manager for Phonogram Records for eight months. He later became a contributor to various guitar publications, and he is a staff writer for Bass Guitar magazine. He is also a patron of London-based guitar and bass school Guitar-X.

He has recorded and released Stick Insect"(2002), The Maverick Helmsman (2004), and The Darkness Inside Mens Hearts.

Beggs and Askew have been heavily involved with a duo named Industrial Salt, which have been successful in Japan. They have written material for Claudia Mills, a finalist on the talent show Let Me Entertain You.

A reformed Kajagoogoo with Beggs, Askew and Croxford Neale toured in 2004. Limahl and Strode both rejoined in 2008, and the band toured extensively. The band released an EP of new material in 2011. In an interview with Cherry Red TV in 2018, Beggs talked about the reunion, stating "we reformed and we toured and we recorded an EP and remastered the back catalogue...and at that point I felt that we had done it all. It was a nice way to tie it up, put a bow on it and leave it alone and move on."

Since 2011, Beggs is a member of Steven Wilson's touring band, having also played on Wilson's albums Grace For Drowning, The Raven That Refused to Sing, Hand. Cannot. Erase., the EP 41/2, To the Bone and The Future Bites.

In February 2013, Beggs's project Lifesigns, with John Young and Frosty Beedle, released a self-titled album.

Beggs also became a member of the band Fish on Friday, which released an album named Godspeed at the end of 2014, and contributed to John Mitchell's solo project Lonely Robot, which released the album Please Come Home in February 2015.

Beggs's latest collaboration is named The Mute Gods, with Marco Minneman and Roger King. Their first album was released in January 2016, titled Do Nothing till You Hear from Me. This was followed up with Tardigrades Will Inherit The Earth in February 2017 and Atheists and Believers in 2019.

Personal life
From his first marriage to Eleni Gagoushi, which ended in 1994, he has one daughter, named Lula, who was born 29 May 1991. He has another daughter, Willow Beggs (b.2002), with his girlfriend Ann Staniford, whom he married in 2003. He is stepfather to his wife's three children: Olivia, Callum and Jake Keenan. Beggs currently lives in Leighton Buzzard, Bedfordshire.

Beggs was a pescetarian for a while and currently is a vegetarian as of January 2016 due to his rejection of the livestock industry.

Discography

Ellis, Beggs and Howard

Singles
 "Big Bubbles No Troubles" – RCA PB 42089 – June 88 – # 59 UK
 "Bad Times" – RCA PB 42041 – August 88
 "Where Did Tomorrow Go?" – RCA PB42317 – November 1988
 "Big Bubbles No Troubles" remix – RCA PB 42089 – February 89 – # 41 UK
 "Big Bubbles No Troubles" remix – RCA PB 42788 – April 1989

Albums
Homelands – RCA – 1988
The Lost Years Volume One – available from Nick Beggs website
The Lost Years Volume Two – again, available from Nick Beggs website as of February 2010

Lifesigns
Lifesigns – Esoteric Antenna – 2013

Solo

Albums
 Stick Insect, 2002 CD Stick Enterprises
 The Maverick Helmsman, 2004 CD Stick Enterprises
 The Darkness Inside Mens Hearts, 2014 Burning Shed: a compilation of the solo Chapman Stick pieces from his two albums Stick Insect (2002) and The Maverick Helmsman (2004)
 Words Fail Me, 2019 CD Cherry Red Records

With other artists
With Steve Hackett
Out of the Tunnel's Mouth, 2009
Beyond the Shrouded Horizon, 2011
Live Rails, 2011
Genesis Revisited II, 2012

With Steven Wilson
Grace For Drowning, 2011
Catalog / Preserve / Amass (live), 2012
Get All You Deserve (live), 2012
The Raven that Refused to Sing, 2013
Drive Home, 2013
Hand. Cannot. Erase., 2015
 4½, 2016
 To the Bone, 2017
 Home Invasion: In Concert at the Royal Albert Hall, 2018
 The Future Bites, 2021

With Lonely Robot (i.e. John Mitchell)
Please Come Home, 2015

With The Mute Gods
Do Nothing till You Hear from Me (2016)
Tardigrades Will Inherit the Earth (2017)
Atheists and Believers (2019)

With Trifecta
Fragments (2021)

References

External links

 Official website
 KajaGooGoo official website
 KajaFax – The KajaGooGoo fan community
 Facebook page for Lifesigns
 The Mute Gods

1961 births
Living people
People from Winslow, Buckinghamshire
English bass guitarists
English male guitarists
Male bass guitarists
English new wave musicians
Chapman Stick players
Lifesigns members